The Modena Baseball Club is a baseball franchise with a tradition of 50 years in Italian baseball. The team is based in the city of Modena, Italy.

Throughout its history, the Modena team has played at different levels, including eight seasons in the Italian Baseball League between 1999 and 2006. Many of the official team nicknames have contained the name of the team's corporate sponsor, the most prominent being the GB Ricandi Modena.

Sources

External links
Modena Baseball Club Official Blog – 50th Anniversary
Modena Baseball Club at Facebook

Baseball teams in Italy